Wat Worachettharam is an ancient temple in Phra Nakhon Si Ayutthaya province, central Thailand, located in inner city of Ayutthaya, also known as Ayutthaya Island, hence the other name Wat Worachet Nai Ko (วัดวรเชษฐ์ในเกาะ, "Worachet Temple on the island").

Originally it was named Wat Chao Chet (วัดเจ้าเชษฐ์, "temple of the royal elder brother") later it was renamed by King Ekathotsarot to Wat Worachettharam, which means "temple of sublime elder brother".

References

External links

Buddhist temples in Phra Nakhon Si Ayutthaya Province
16th-century Buddhist temples
Religious buildings and structures completed in 1593